Mladoňovice may refer to places in the Czech Republic:

Mladoňovice (Chrudim District), a municipality and village in the Pardubice Region
Mladoňovice (Třebíč District), a municipality village in the Vysočina Region